Xian Zhang, born in 1973 in Dandong, Liaoning) is a Chinese-American conductor.

Born to musician parents, Zhang began to learn music as a child with her mother on a piano built by her father. She continued her music studies at the Central Conservatory of Music in Beijing.  She began conducting studies at age 16, and received her bachelor's and master's degrees from the conservatory in Beijing.  Her first conducting appearance was at age 19 with the China National Opera Orchestra in a production of The Marriage of Figaro. She served as conductor-in-residence of the China Opera House in Beijing, and conductor of the Jinfan Symphony Orchestra.

Zhang moved to the United States in 1998. She studied for her doctorate in music at the University of Cincinnati College-Conservatory of Music, and also served for four years as music director of the university's Concert Orchestra.  In 2002, she shared in the first prize of the first Maazel-Vilar Conductor's Competition.  She served as a cover conductor with the New York Philharmonic from 2002 to 2004.  She became an assistant conductor with the New York Philharmonic in 2004, and her conducting debut with the orchestra was in a Young People's Concert that year.  In January 2005, she made her Philharmonic subscription debut in January 2005 on a program shared with Lorin Maazel. Maazel subsequently appointed Xian Zhang as the orchestra's associate conductor in 2005, a post she held for several years.

Zhang served as the fifth music director of the Sioux City Symphony Orchestra from 2005 to 2007. In January 2008, she became the first woman to conduct the Staatskapelle Dresden in its principal hall. In March 2009, the Orchestra Sinfonica di Milano Giuseppe Verdi announced the appointment of Zhang as its next music director, the first woman to be named music director of an Italian symphony orchestra, effective with the 2009–2010 season. In December 2010, the Nederlandse Orkest- en Ensemble-Academie (NJO; Dutch Orchestra and Ensemble Academy) named Zhang its artistic leader, as of the summer of 2011. She held the NJO post until September 2015.  With the Orchestra Sinfonica di Milano Giuseppe Verdi, she completed her tenure as music director in 2016, and now has the title of Direttore Emerito (conductor emeritus) with the ensemble.

Zhang first guest-conducted the New Jersey Symphony Orchestra in 2010, and returned for further guest appearances in February 2012 and May 2015. In November 2015, the NJSO announced her appointment as its 14th music director, effective in September 2016, with an initial contract of 4 years. She is the first female conductor to be named music director of the NJSO. In March 2022, the NJSO announced the second extension of her contract, through the 2027–2028 season. In December 2015, the BBC National Orchestra of Wales (BBC NOW) announced her appointment as its next principal guest conductor, effective with the 2016–2017 season, with an initial contract of 3 years.  She is the first female conductor named to a titled post with any BBC orchestra. In this capacity, with the BBC NOW, she was the first woman conductor ever to conduct the annual Prom which includes the Symphony No. 9 of Beethoven, on 30 July 2017.

In 2019, Zhang was announced as Principal Guest Conductor of the Melbourne Symphony Orchestra, beginning in 2020.

Zhang and her husband Yang Lei have two sons.

References

External links 
N.J. Symphony Orchestra’s leader is becoming a big deal in the classical world. Here’s why.

Xian Zhang makes conducting history as first woman to have titled role at a BBC orchestra

N.J. Symphony Orchestra climbs the Mt. Everest of classical pieces in Princeton
 HarrisonParrott agency biography of Xian Zhang

Career

1973 births
Living people
American classical musicians of Chinese descent
Chinese conductors (music)
People's Republic of China musicians
Women conductors (music)
Musicians from Liaoning
People from Dandong
20th-century American conductors (music)
20th-century Chinese musicians
21st-century American conductors (music)
20th-century American women musicians
20th-century Chinese women musicians
21st-century American women musicians